The Adventures of God is a 2000  Argentine fantasy drama film directed and written by Eliseo Subiela.

The film premiered on 1 September 2000 in Canada. Starring Daniel Freire.

Main cast
 Pasta Dioguardi ....  Protagonist
 Flor Sabatella ....  Valeri
 Daniel Freire ....  Jesus Christ
 Lorenzo Quinteros
 María Concepción César
 José María Gutiérrez
 Walter Balzarini
 Enrique Blugerman

Other cast
 Mariana Arias ....  Guest #1
 Victoria Bertone ....  Huésped 2
 Ana María Giunta ....  Guest 4
 Jorge Lira ....  Hombre Boquilla
 Lalo Mir ....  Huésped 3
 Pino Paperella ....  Sr. Petersen
 Carmen Renard ....  Madre en Bolsa
 Sandra Sandrini ....  Esposa

References

External links
 

2000 films
2000s Spanish-language films
2000s fantasy drama films
Argentine fantasy drama films
2000 drama films
2000s Argentine films